Litovel is a town in Olomouc District in the Olomouc Region of the Czech Republic. It has about 9,600 inhabitants. The historic town centre is well preserved and is protected by law as an urban monument zone.

Administrative parts
Villages of Březové, Chudobín, Myslechovice, Nasobůrky, Nová Ves, Rozvadovice, Savín, Tři Dvory, Unčovice and Víska are administrative parts of Litovel.

Geography
Litovel lies in the Upper Morava Valley lowland. The Morava River and six its branches flow through the town, which gave it the nickname "Moravian Venice".

The northern part of the municipal territory lies in the Litovelské Pomoraví Protected Landscape Area, named after the town.

History

The first written mention of Litovel is from 1287, older documents have been proven to be forgeries. The town was founded between 1252 and 1256 by Ottokar II of Bohemia.

In 1327, King John of Bohemia allowed the town to build walls. The royal town developed until the Hussite Wars. After the war, Litovel asked for the assignment of a protector and came under the protection of the Vlašim family from Úsov. In the 16th century, the lords of Boskovice acquired the Úsov dominion, Litovel became their property and lost its statute of a royal town.

In the early 17th century, Litovel was acquired by the House of Liechtenstein and lost its significance. The town was further affected by the Thirty Years' War, during which was plundered by the Swedish army, and by plague epidemics.

In 1850, Litovel became a district town and began to grow with the influx of inhabitants from the surroundings. The Czech population began to prevail over the German, and the town became a centre of Czech culture and education. At the beginning of the 20th century, trade and industry began to develop rapidly, and new factories for processing agricultural products were established.

Demographics

Economy
Litovel is known especially for the food industry. In the village of Tři Dvory is located a factory of Adriana, a manufacturer of pasta, and Brazzale, a cheese-producing company which has here one of the largest hard-cheese producing factories in the world.

Litovel is also known for its brewery. The tradition of brewing beer here began in 1297.

Pro-Ject brand turntables and audio equipment are manufactured in Litovel.

Sights

The historic town centre is formed by the Přemysla Otakara II. Square and its surroundings. It was delimited by the Morava and its branches, and by town walls, which remnants are preserved. The landmark of the town square is the town hall. It was originally a manor house which was sold to the town in 1557. It was reconstructed in 1572 and baroque modified in 1724.

The town square is lines by preserved burger houses. A plague column stands in the middle of the square. It was created in 1724. The pillar is decorated with seven statues of plaque patrons and The Holy Virgin on the top.

The Bridge of Saint John is a stone bridge over the Morava River. It was constructed in 1592, and it is the third oldest bridge in the country (and the oldest stone bridge in Moravia).

A notable building is the Gymnasium of Jan Opletal. The Neorenaissance school building comes from 1901 and is decorated with four ceramic mosaics designed by Jano Köhler, which depict scenes from the history of the town.

The Church of Saints Philip and James is the probably the oldest church in Litovel. Its existence was first mentioned in 1342. It was completely rebuilt after in the early Baroque style in 1692–1694.

The Church of Saint Mark was originally a Gothic church, also first recorded in 1342. The extensive renaissance reconstruction took place in 1529–1532, after the Thirty Year's War it was baroque modified.

Notable people
Gustav Tschermak von Seysenegg (1836–1927), Austrian mineralogist
Karl Kostersitz von Marenhorst (1839–1897), Austro-Hungarian general
Marija Ružička Strozzi (1850–1937), Croatian actress
Hans Temple (1857–1931), Czech-Austrian painter
Gustav Frištenský (1879–1957), strongman and wrestler; lived and died here
Henry Kulka (1900–1971), Czech-New Zealander architect
Jan Čep (1902–1974), Czech writer and translator
Přemysl Krbec (1940–2021), gymnast

Twin towns – sister cities

Litovel is twinned with:
 Littau (Lucerne), Switzerland
 Revúca, Slovakia
 Wieliczka, Poland

References

External links

Populated places in Olomouc District
Cities and towns in the Czech Republic